Hjalmar Strømme (26 September 1900 – 15 December 1925) was a Norwegian boxer who competed in the 1920 Summer Olympics. In 1920 he finished fourth in the middleweight class after losing the bronze medal bout to Moe Herscovitch.

References

External links
 List of Norwegian boxers 

1900 births
1925 deaths
Middleweight boxers
Olympic boxers of Norway
Boxers at the 1920 Summer Olympics
Norwegian male boxers
20th-century Norwegian people